

Buildings and structures

Buildings
 Amenhotep III begins the construction of Luxor Temple.

Architecture